Bon Bini Holland 3 is a 2022 Dutch film directed by Pieter van Rijn. The film won the Golden Film award after having sold 100,000 tickets. The film also won the Platinum Film award after having sold 400,000 tickets. The film is the sequel to the 2018 film Bon Bini Holland 2.

It was the second best visited Dutch film of 2022 with just over 440,000 visitors. The film finished in 15th place in the list of best visited films in the Netherlands in 2022.

Jandino Asporaat won the Gouden Kalf van het Publiek award for the film. The film also won the Favoriete Jeugdfilm NL award at the 2023 Zapp Awards.

The film was shot in the Netherlands, Germany, Curaçao and New York City.

See also 
 Bon Bini Holland (2015 film)
 Bon Bini Holland 2 (2018 film)

References

External links 
 

2022 films
2020s Dutch-language films
Dutch comedy films
2022 comedy films
Films directed by Pieter van Rijn
Films shot in New York City
Films shot in Curaçao
Films shot in Germany
Films shot in the Netherlands
Dutch sequel films